The 2019–20 Boston Bruins season was the 96th season for the National Hockey League franchise that was established on November 1, 1924. The Bruins entered the season as the defending Eastern Conference champions.

The season was suspended by the league officials on March 12, 2020, after several other professional and collegiate sports organizations followed suit as a result of the ongoing COVID-19 pandemic. On May 26, the NHL regular season was officially declared over with the remaining games being cancelled, while the Bruins were awarded the Presidents' Trophy. The Bruins advanced to the playoffs for the fourth consecutive season. However, in the second round, they were defeated by the Tampa Bay Lightning in five games.

Standings

Divisional standings

Eastern Conference

Schedule and results

Preseason
The preseason schedule was published on June 18, 2019.

Regular season
The regular season schedule was published on June 25, 2019.

Playoffs 

The Bruins played in a round-robin tournament to determine their seed for the playoffs. Boston finished with a 0–3–0 record to clinch the fourth seed for the playoffs.

The Bruins faced the Carolina Hurricanes in the first round, defeating them in five games.

In the second round, the Bruins faced the Tampa Bay Lightning, and lost in five games.

Player statistics

Skaters

Goaltenders

†Denotes player spent time with another team before joining the Bruins. Stats reflect time with the Bruins only.
‡Denotes player was traded mid-season. Stats reflect time with the Bruins only.
Bold/italics denotes franchise record.

References

Boston Bruins seasons
Presidents' Trophy seasons
Boston Bruins
Boston Bruins
Boston Bruins
Boston Bruins
Bruins
Bruins